Crough is a surname. Notable people with the surname include:

Gerald Crough (born 1937), Australian rules footballer
Suzanne Crough (1963–2015), American child actress